Chaotic Neutral is the seventh solo album by Matthew Good. The album was nominated for "Rock Album of the Year" at the 2016 Juno Awards.

Track listing
All songs written by Matthew Good except "Cloudbusting", written by Kate Bush.

Charts

Credits
Art direction – Derek Broad, Matthew Good
Design – Derek Broad
Second engineer – Joel Livesey
Mastered by Andy Vandette
Mixed by Warne Livesey
Producer – Warne Livesey

References

2015 albums
Matthew Good albums
Albums produced by Warne Livesey
Albums recorded at Noble Street Studios